Unidos (translation from Sardinian: "United") is a centre-right separatist political party in Sardinia.

History 
The party was launched by Mauro Pili, a long-time member of centre-right parties like Forza Italia (FI) and The People of Freedom (PdL) and a former President of Sardinia (1999, 2001–2003), in November 2011. Originally a faction within the PdL, Unidos soon became a party upon Pili's exit from that party in October 2013. As Pili had been elected to the Chamber of Deputies
in the 2013 general election, Unidos was represented in Parliament until 2018.

In the 2014 regional election Pili ran for president and won 5.7% of the vote, while the party and a list named after the leader obtained 2.8% and 1.7% of the vote, respectively, both with no seats in the Regional Council.

In the 2019 regional election Pili stood again as a candidate for president, this time at the head of a joint list formed by Unidos, Project Republic of Sardinia (ProgReS) and minor groups. He won 2.3% of the vote, while the list stopped at 2.1%, resulting in no seats in the Regional Council.

Electoral history

References

External links
Official website

Political parties in Sardinia